Arelee is an unincorporated community in central Saskatchewan, Canada, approximately  west of Saskatoon.  It is located in the Rural Municipality of Eagle Creek No. 376. The RM's offices constitute one of the only businesses in the community.

Prior to March 21, 2002, Arelee was a village, but it was restructured as an unincorporated community on that date.

The large white church at the north end of the community is the Arelee Mennonite Brethren church.  It was founded in 1908.  The church has been sold to a local family.

Demographics 

References 

Eagle Creek No. 376, Saskatchewan
Designated places in Saskatchewan
Former villages in Saskatchewan
Unincorporated communities in Saskatchewan
Populated places disestablished in 2002